Reedville may refer to:

 Reedville, Oregon, United States
 Reedville, Texas, United States
 Reedville, Virginia, United States

See also

 Readville
 Reedsville (disambiguation)
 Reidville (disambiguation)